The 52nd parallel north is a circle of latitude that is 52 degrees north of the Earth's equatorial plane. It crosses Europe, Asia, the Pacific Ocean, North America, and the Atlantic Ocean.

In Canada, part of the legally defined border between Quebec and Newfoundland and Labrador is defined by the parallel, though Quebec maintains a dormant claim to some of the territory north of this line.

The catchment area of London, the capital city of England and the United Kingdom, can be broadly defined by the 51st and 52nd parallels.

At this latitude the sun is visible for 16 hours, 44 minutes during the summer solstice and 7 hours, 45 minutes during the winter solstice.

Around the world

Starting at the Prime Meridian (just west of the village of Barkway in Hertfordshire, England) and heading eastwards, the parallel 52° north passes through:

{| class="wikitable plainrowheaders"
! scope="col" width="125" | Co-ordinates
! scope="col" | Country, territory or sea
! scope="col" | Notes
|-
| 
! scope="row" | 
| England - passing just south of Ipswich 
|-
| style="background:#b0e0e6;" | 
! scope="row" style="background:#b0e0e6;" | North Sea
| style="background:#b0e0e6;" |
|-valign="top"
| 
! scope="row" | 
| Provinces of South Holland, Utrecht and Gelderland, including directly through the cities of Delft, Gouda, Nieuwegein, and Arnhem.
|-valign="top"
| 
! scope="row" | 
| States of North Rhine-Westphalia, Lower Saxony, Saxony-Anhalt and Brandenburg
|-
| 
! scope="row" | 
| passing just north of Zielona Góra, and through Biała Podlaska Airport
|-
| 
! scope="row" | 
|
|-
| 
! scope="row" | 
| Chernihiv OblastSumy Oblast — passing just north of Shostka
|-
| 
! scope="row" | 
|
|-
| 
! scope="row" | 
|
|-
| 
! scope="row" | 
|
|-
| 
! scope="row" | 
|
|-
| 
! scope="row" | 
| Passing through Lake Baikal
|-valign="top"
| 
! scope="row" | 
| Inner Mongolia  Heilongjiang
|-
| 
! scope="row" | 
|-
| style="background:#b0e0e6;" | 
! scope="row" style="background:#b0e0e6;" | Strait of Tartary
| style="background:#b0e0e6;" |
|-
| 
! scope="row" | 
| Island of Sakhalin
|-
| style="background:#b0e0e6;" | 
! scope="row" style="background:#b0e0e6;" | Sea of Okhotsk
| style="background:#b0e0e6;" |
|-
| 
! scope="row" | 
| Kamchatka Peninsula
|-
| style="background:#b0e0e6;" | 
! scope="row" style="background:#b0e0e6;" | Pacific Ocean
| style="background:#b0e0e6;" |
|-
| 
! scope="row" | 
| Alaska - Kiska Island
|-
| style="background:#b0e0e6;" | 
! scope="row" style="background:#b0e0e6;" | Bering Sea
| style="background:#b0e0e6;" |
|-
| 
! scope="row" | 
| Alaska - Segula Island
|-valign="top"
| style="background:#b0e0e6;" | 
! scope="row" style="background:#b0e0e6;" | Bering Sea
| style="background:#b0e0e6;" | Passing just north of Khvostof Island, Davidof Island and Little Sitkin Island, Alaska, 
|-
| 
! scope="row" | 
| Alaska - Semisopochnoi Island
|-valign="top"
| style="background:#b0e0e6;" | 
! scope="row" style="background:#b0e0e6;" | Bering Sea
| style="background:#b0e0e6;" | Passing just north of Tanaga Island and Kanaga Island, Alaska, 
|-
| 
! scope="row" | 
| Alaska - Adak Island
|-
| style="background:#b0e0e6;" | 
! scope="row" style="background:#b0e0e6;" | Bering Sea
| style="background:#b0e0e6;" |
|-
| 
! scope="row" | 
| Alaska - Great Sitkin Island
|-valign="top"
| style="background:#b0e0e6;" | 
! scope="row" style="background:#b0e0e6;" | Bering Sea
| style="background:#b0e0e6;" | Passing just north of Igitkin Island, Tagalak Island and Oglodak Island, Alaska, 
|-valign="top"
| style="background:#b0e0e6;" | 
! scope="row" style="background:#b0e0e6;" | Pacific Ocean
| style="background:#b0e0e6;" | Passing just south of Atka Island and Amlia Island, Alaska, 
|-
| 
! scope="row" | 
| British Columbia - Kunghit Island
|-
| style="background:#b0e0e6;" | 
! scope="row" style="background:#b0e0e6;" | Pacific Ocean
| style="background:#b0e0e6;" | Queen Charlotte Sound
|-valign="top"
| 
! scope="row" | 
| British Columbia - Hunter Island, King Island and the mainland Alberta Saskatchewan Manitoba - including Lake Winnipegosis and Lake Winnipeg Ontario
|-
| style="background:#b0e0e6;" | 
! scope="row" style="background:#b0e0e6;" | James Bay
| style="background:#b0e0e6;" |
|-
| 
! scope="row" | 
| Nunavut - Charlton Island and Carey Island
|-
| style="background:#b0e0e6;" | 
! scope="row" style="background:#b0e0e6;" | James Bay
| style="background:#b0e0e6;" |
|-valign="top"
| 
! scope="row" | 
| Quebec Newfoundland and Labrador Quebec Quebec / Newfoundland and Labrador border (disputed by Quebec) Newfoundland and Labrador
|-
| style="background:#b0e0e6;" | 
! scope="row" style="background:#b0e0e6;" | Atlantic Ocean
| style="background:#b0e0e6;" | Strait of Belle Isle
|-
| 
! scope="row" | 
| Newfoundland and Labrador - Belle Isle
|-
| style="background:#b0e0e6;" | 
! scope="row" style="background:#b0e0e6;" | Atlantic Ocean
| style="background:#b0e0e6;" |
|-
| 
! scope="row" | 
| Passing directly through the country's highest point Carrauntoohil, County Kerry, County Cork, County Waterford
|-
| style="background:#b0e0e6;" | 
! scope="row" style="background:#b0e0e6;" | St George's Channel
| style="background:#b0e0e6;" |
|-valign="top"
| 
! scope="row" | 
| Wales England - passing between Bletchley and Milton Keynes at 0° 44′ W
|-
|}

See also
51st parallel north
53rd parallel north

References

n52
Borders of Quebec
Borders of Newfoundland and Labrador